Luke Field may refer to either of two United States military facilities: 

Luke Air Force Base, Arizona. 
Naval Auxiliary Landing Field Ford Island, Hawaii.